Max Berendson (18 May 1917 – 30 August 1984) was a Peruvian athlete. He competed in the men's long jump at the 1936 Summer Olympics.

References

1917 births
1984 deaths
Athletes (track and field) at the 1936 Summer Olympics
Peruvian male long jumpers
Olympic athletes of Peru
Place of birth missing